The Robert E. Webber Institute for Worship Studies (IWS) is a non-denominational graduate theological school (emphasizing worship theology) which employs a hybrid course delivery system combining intensive on-campus pedagogy and distance learning methods. The administrative offices, library, and classroom space for the on-campus intensives are provided by a church in Jacksonville, Florida.

History 
IWS was conceived of in the 1990s by worship theologian Robert E. Webber, who intended to provide doctoral-level theological training to Worship Leaders and Music Ministers, who often complete master's degrees in areas like music or theology, and thus lack the divinity credentials to enroll in Doctor of Ministry programs. The first student cohort began matriculating at what was then called simply "The Institute for Worship Studies" in June 1999 with a class of twenty Doctor of Worship Studies (D.W.S.) students. The Masters of Worship Studies (M.W.S.) program began in 2002. After Dr. Webber died in 2007, the Board of Trustees voted to rename the school in his honor, and it has been called "The Robert E. Webber Institute for Worship Studies" ever since. IWS has been cited in the "Best of the Best" issues of Worship Leader Magazine in the area of Worship Education and Training multiple times, most recently in November, 2016. Due to ongoing growth, the school relocated to the campus of Hendricks Avenue Baptist Church, in Jacksonville, FL.

Academics

Accreditation 
The Robert E. Webber Institute for Worship Studies was granted accredited status by the Commission on Accreditation (COA) of the Association for Biblical Higher Education in 2010, having become a member of the same in 2005. Accredited status was reaffirmed by the ABHE COA in February 2015. IWS became an Associate Member of the Association of Theological Schools in June, 2018, and is pursuing a second accreditation with that body.

Master of Worship Studies (M.W.S.) 
The master's program consists of four core courses and the ministry internship, for a total of 30 credits.
 MWS 501: A Biblical Theology of Worship
 MWS 502: The History of Christian Worship
 MWS 503: Spirituality in a Postmodern World
 MWS 504: Cross-cultural Perspectives in Christian Worship
 MWS 601: The Ministry Internship

Doctor of Worship Studies (D.W.S.) 
The doctoral program consists of four core courses, the Practicum, and the thesis course, for a total of 34 credits. The program is similar in rigor and philosophy to a Doctor of Ministry degree.
 DWS 701: The Biblical Foundations and Historical Development of Christian Worship
 DWS 702: Sunday Worship: Music and the Arts
 DWS 703: The Church Year
 DWS 704: The Sacred Actions and Ministries of Worship
 DWS 702P-704P: The Practicum
 DWS 801: The Thesis Course

Faculty 
The IWS Faculty consists entirely of adjuncts who almost all teach full-time at other schools. Faculty members hold positions at such schools as Wheaton College (Illinois), Lincoln Christian Seminary, Northwestern College, College of the Ozarks, Cornerstone University, Indiana Wesleyan University, Messiah College, Reformed Theological Seminary, Walla Walla University, and Furman University.
 Jeff Barker, M.F.A.
 Doris Borchert, D.Min. (Professor Emerita)
 Gerald Borchert, Ph.D. (Professor Emeritus)
 Constance M. Cherry, D.Min.
 Vaughn Crowe-Tipton, Ph.D.
Doug Curry, D.Min.
Dinelle Frankland, D.W.S.
 Donna Hawk-Reinhard, Ph.D.
 Andrew E. Hill, Ph.D.
 Jessica Jones, D.W.S.
Lou Kaloger, D.W.S.
 Reggie Kidd, Ph.D.
 Susan Massey, M.L.I.S., M.Div.
Pedrito Maynard-Reid, Ph.D.
Carl Park, Ph.D.
 Alan Rathe, Ph.D.
 Daniel L. Sharp, D.M.A.
 Jack Van Marion, D.Min.
 Kent Walters, D.W.S.
 Gregory Wilde, D.W.S.

Board of Trustees 
 Dr. Eric Bolger (Vice Chair)
 Dr. Melva Costen (Trustee Emerita)
 The Rev. Dr. Wayne Freeberg (Sect'y/Treasurer)
 The Rev. Dr. James R. Hart (President)
 Dr. John Lindsell (Chair)
 Ms. Joanne Lindsell Webber (Trustee Emerita)
 Ms. Patricia Witt
 Mr. Don Moen
Dr. Luder Whitlock (Trustee Emeritus)

References 

Seminaries and theological colleges in Florida
Nondenominational Christian universities and colleges
Association for Biblical Higher Education
Educational institutions established in 1999
1999 establishments in Florida